"Play Me Like You Play Your Guitar" is a song written by Keith Potger and Tony Macaulay and performed by Duane Eddy, with vocals by the Rebelettes. The song reached #9 on the UK Singles Chart in 1975 and number 70 in Australia.

The song was produced by Tony Macaulay.

References

1975 songs
1975 singles
Songs written by Tony Macaulay
Duane Eddy songs
GTO Records singles
Songs written by Keith Potger